Fritz Maurischat (April 27, 1893 in Berlin – December 11, 1986) was a German production designer. He made his film debut in 1924. Over the next 38 years, he worked on over 70 films, all of them in his native Germany.

He earned an Oscar nomination in 1953 for his work on the film Martin Luther, an American film about Martin Luther made in Germany. He is also noted as the Art Director for the 1943 Nazi propaganda film Titanic.

Selected filmography
 Taxi at Midnight (1929)
 The Ship of Lost Souls (1929)
 Salto Mortale (1931)
 The Night Without Pause (1931)
 The Rebel (1932)
 Spell of the Looking Glass (1932)
 The Page from the Dalmasse Hotel (1933)
 Little Girl, Great Fortune  (1933)
 Anna and Elizabeth (1933)
  The Voice of Love (1934)
 Decoy (1934)
  A Night of Change (1935)
 The Old and the Young King (1935)
 Family Parade (1936)
 Ball at the Metropol (1937)
 Sergeant Berry (1938)
 A Man Astray (1940)
 Carl Peters (1941)
 Wedding Night In Paradise (1950)
 When a Woman Loves (1950)
  Love's Awakening (1953)
 Roses from the South (1954)
 Dunja (1955)
 Love's Carnival (1955)
 Without You All Is Darkness (1956)
 The Ideal Woman (1959)

See also
 List of German-speaking Academy Award winners and nominees

References
Fritz Maurischat - Filmography - New York Times

1893 births
1986 deaths
Film people from Berlin
German production designers